Chris Kibble (born 24 July 1963) is a British pianist and keyboard player. He started with the jazz fusion band Kafo in 1985, then joined acid jazz band Snowboy. Kibble attended Sedgehill Secondary School in southeast London, England.

He has worked with Robin Jones Latin Jazz Sextet, Ricardo de Santos, Charlie Palmieri, Pucho & His Latin Soul Brothers, Gordon Smith, Fuzz Against Junk, Terry Callier, Don Rendell, and King Salsa.

Since 2008, Kibble has been a member of the Screened Music Network.

Discography

As sideman
With Terry Callier
 2001 Alive 
 2002 Speak Your Peace
 2003 Total Recall
 2005 Live in Berlin
 2005 Lookin' Out

With others
 1994 Elegant Slumming, M People
 1996 Descarga Mambito, Snowboy
 1996 Something's Coming, Snowboy
 2014 Seven Steps to Heaven, Robin Jones
 2018 Robots, Charlotte Glasson

References 

1963 births
Living people